Fort Ross may refer to:
Fort Ross, California, United States 
Fort Ross, Nunavut, Canada
 Fort Ross (HBC vessel), operated by the HBC from 1938-1950, see Hudson's Bay Company vessels

Fort Ross may also refer to:
Fort Ross Weevil, scientific name Trigonoscuta rossi, a species of beetle
Fort Ross (film), film set in Fort Ross, California, during Russian colonialism